The Haidu Mill or Haikū Sugar Mill was a processing factory for sugarcane from 1861 to 1879 on the island of Maui in Hawaii.

History
The northeastern coast of Maui has a small village named Hai kū which literally means "sharp break" in the Hawaiian language.

The Haiku Sugar Company was chartered on November 20, 1858 by the Kingdom of Hawaii. It was one of the first ten companies to go into the sugar business in the Hawaiian Islands. The investors, the Castle & Cooke partnership, contracted with Isaac Adams of Boston and D. M. Weston for a milling machine and boiling house with total cost of US$12,000. The first crop was processed in December 1861. In 1871 Samuel T. Alexander became manager of the mill. He formed Alexander & Baldwin with his partner Henry Perrine Baldwin, and organized an irrigation system from 1876 to 1878 that allowed more steady crops to be grown in more leeward areas of the island. As a result, Haiku Mill was abandoned in 1879.

In 1881 Kahului railroad allowed cane to be carried to larger mills near the town of Kahului. In 1905 the Haiku plantation merged with another to become Maui Agricultural Company, and later became the Hawaiian Commercial and Sugar Company division of Alexander & Baldwin with one remaining mill at Puunene. The Haikū area later became a pineapple plantation. The former cannery at 810 Haiku Road is now a shopping center called the Haiku Marketplace.

Only the walls of the mill were left standing when it was added to the National Register of Historic Places on February 6, 1986 as site 86000189, listed as "Haiku Mill". It is state historic site 50-046-1622.

The mill was purchased and restored by Sylvia Hamilton-Kerr and as of 2016 was open for tourism.

See also
 Sugar plantations in Hawaii

References

1861 establishments in Hawaii
Agricultural buildings and structures in Hawaii
Agricultural buildings and structures on the National Register of Historic Places in Hawaii
Alexander & Baldwin
Buildings and structures in Maui County, Hawaii
Dole plc
History of sugar
Industrial buildings and structures on the National Register of Historic Places in Hawaii
Industrial buildings completed in 1861
National Register of Historic Places in Maui County, Hawaii
Sugar refineries
Tourism in Hawaii
1879 disestablishments in Hawaii
Hawaii Register of Historic Places